Sic O'Clock News was a Philippine political satire news and comedy show which aired on IBC 13 from January 4, 1987, to September 15, 1990.

Cast
Jimmy Fabregas as Sonny Esguerra (1987-1990)
Ces Quesada as Lilian Polly Catubusan Labaybay (1987-1990)
Hero Bautista (1988)
Rene Requiestas (1987-1989)
Junix Inocian (1988)
Lou Veloso (1988)
Manny Castañeda
Joji Isla
Wilson Go
Jon Achaval
Ching Arellano
Pen Medina
Errol Dionisio
Celeste Bueno
Dina Padilla
Khryss Adalia
Nonoy Oplas (1989-1990)
Nonie Buencamino (1989-1990)
Domeng Landicho (1989-1990)

Characters

Re-runs
Reruns of the series was aired on IBC from February 11 to July 19, 2019.
Clips from the series was shown on IBC's archival program Retro TV in 2003.

See also
List of programs previously broadcast by Intercontinental Broadcasting Corporation
May Tamang Balita

References

1980s Philippine television series
1990s Philippine television series
1987 Philippine television series debuts
1990 Philippine television series endings
Filipino-language television shows
Intercontinental Broadcasting Corporation original programming
Philippine comedy television series
Political satirical television series